The Tecno F3 line is a series of open-wheel Formula Three race cars, designed, developed and produced by Italian manufacturer Tecno between 1966 and 1976, starting with the TF/66.

References

Open wheel racing cars
Formula Three cars